The 2014 Vuelta a Murcia was the 30th professional edition of the Vuelta a Murcia cycle race and was held on 1 March 2014. The race started in Beniel and finished at the Castle of Lorca. The race was won by Alejandro Valverde.

General classification

References

2014
2014 in road cycling
2014 in Spanish sport